Rail transport – means of conveyance of passengers and goods by way of wheeled vehicles running on rail tracks consisting of steel rails installed on sleepers/ties and ballast.

What type of thing is rail transport? 

Rail transport can be described as all of the following:

 Technology – making, usage, and knowledge of tools, machines, techniques, crafts, systems or methods of organization in order to solve a problem or perform a specific function. It can also refer to the collection of such tools, machinery, and procedures.
 Applied technology
 Transport – movement of humans, animals and goods from one location to another.
 Rapid transit

Essence of rail transport 
 Railway systems engineering
 Environmental design in rail transportation
 Rail transport operations
 List of railway industry occupations
 Passenger train
 Rail freight transport

Types of railway/railroad
 Fell mountain railway system
 Heavy rail
 Inter-city rail
 High-speed rail
 Higher-speed rail
 Heritage railway
 Monorail
 Mountain railway
 Plateway
 Rack railway
 Tourist railroad
 Wagonway

Urban rail transport, general types
Urban rail transit – overview
Rapid transit
Elevated railway
Cable railway
Funicular (or inclined railway)
Regional rail
Commuter rail
Interurban
Light rail
Very light rail/Ultra light rail
Medium-capacity rail system/light rapid transit/light metro/premetro
People mover
Tramway (or streetcar)

History of rail transport 

History of rail transport
 Chronological list: Lists of rail transport events by year
 Lists of rail accidents
 List of rail accidents (2000–present)
 Railroad chronometer
 Railway Mail Service (USA)
 Railway post office
 Railway Mania (UK)
 Railway Express Agency (USA)

Vehicles 
 Car float
 Road-rail vehicle
 Rail car mover
 Railgrinder
 Train ferry

Trains 
 Train
 Parts
 Bogie
 Wheelset
 Rolling stock
 Railroad car
 Railbus
 Railcar
 Tram
 Tram-train

Locomotives 
 Locomotive
 Steam locomotive
 Diesel locomotive
 Electric locomotive

Railway infrastructure 
 Railway platform

Permanent way 
 Axe ties 
 Baulk road 
 Breather switch 
 Cant 
 Clip and scotch
 Datenail 
 Fishplate 
 Ladder track 
 Minimum radius 
 Permanent way (current) 
 Permanent way (history) 
 Rail fastening system 
 Rail profile 
 Railroad tie (sleeper) 
 Track ballast 
 Track transition curve

Trackwork and track structures 
 Balloon loop
 Classification yard 
 Gauntlet track 
 Junction 
 Overhead lines 
 Passing loop 
 Rail track 
 Rail yard 
 Railroad switch 
 Railway electrification system 
 Railway turntable 
 Siding 
 Track gauge 
 Track pan 
 Tramway track 
 Water crane 
 Wye

Railway track layouts

Running lines 
Track (Running lines)
 Single track
 Passing loop
 Double track
 Quadruple track
 Crossover

Rail sidings 
Rail sidings
 Balloon loop
 Headshunt
 Rail yard
 Classification yard

Rail junctions 
Rail junctions
 Flying junction
 Level junction
 Double junction
 Facing and trailing
 Grand union
 Wye
 Switch / turnout / points
 Swingnose crossing
 Level crossing

Railway station track layouts 
Railway station

 Side platform
 Island platform
 Bay platform
 Split platform
 Terminal station
 Balloon loop
 Spanish solution
 Cross-platform interchange
 Interchange station

Hillclimbing 
Hillclimbing
 Horseshoe curve
 Zig Zag / Switchback
 Spiral

Signalling and safety 
 Block post
 Buffer stop 
 Catch points 
 Integrated Electronic Control Centre
 Interlocking 
 Level crossing 
 Loading gauge 
 Railway signal 
 Railway signalling 
 Signalling control 
 Structure gauge

Buildings 
 Coaling tower
 Goods shed 
 Motive power depot 
 Roundhouse
 Station building 
 Train shed 
 Train station

Rail transport by region 
 Rail transport by country
 Rail transport in Argentina
 Rail transport in Australia
 Rail transport in Belgium
 Rail transport in Brazil
 Rail transport in Canada
 Rail transport in China
 Rail transport in France
 Rail transport in Germany
 Rail transport in Hong Kong
 Rail transport in India
 Rail transport in Italy
 Rail transport in Japan
 Rail transport in Kazakhstan
 Rail transport in Mexico
 Rail transport in Namibia
 Rail transport in the Netherlands
 Rail transport in New Zealand
 Rail transport in Poland
 Rail transport in Russia
 Rail transport in South Africa
 Rail transport in South Korea
 Rail transport in Spain
 Rail transport in Taiwan
 Rail transport in Ukraine
 Rail transport in the United Kingdom
 Rail transportation in the United States
 List of countries by rail transport network size
 List of countries by rail usage

Rail transport politics 
 Rail transport laws
 Esch-Cummins Act
 Interstate Commerce Act of 1887
 Rail Passenger Service Act
 Railroad Revitalization and Regulatory Reform Act
 Railway Construction Act
 Railway Labor Act
 Railway Nationalization Act
 Railways Act (United Kingdom railway legislation)
 Railways Act 1921
 Railways Act 1993
 Railways Act 2005
 Privatisation of British Rail
 Impact of the privatisation of British Rail
 Railway nationalization
 Rail transport agencies
 Railway Procurement Agency (Ireland)

Rail culture 
 Rail trail
 Rail transport modelling
 Rail usage statistics by country
 Railfan
 Railroad Museum of Pennsylvania
 Rail directions
 Usage of the terms railroad and railway
 Passenger rail terminology

General concepts 
 Conductor (rail)
 Rail pass
 Train ticket
 Transit pass

Rail transport organizations 
 National Union of Rail, Maritime and Transport Workers
 International Association of Railway Operations Research
 International Union of Railways

Rail transport publications 
 List of railroad-related periodicals

Persons influential in rail transport 

 List of people associated with rail transport
 George Stephenson (1781–1848) 
 Robert Stephenson (1803–1859) 
 Isambard Kingdom Brunel (1806–1859)
 Thomas Brassey (1805–1870)

See also 

 Glossary of rail transport terms
 List of heritage railways
 List of named passenger trains
 List of rail gauges
 List of railway industry occupations
 List of railway companies
 List of railway roundhouses
 List of suburban and commuter rail systems
 Megaproject
 Mine railway
 Railway Technical Centre

References

External links 

Rail transport
Rail transport
Rail transport